Herichthys tepehua is a species of cichlid endemic to Mexico where it occurs in the Pantepec, Cazones, Tenixtepec, Tecolutla and Solteros River drainages in the states of Veracruz and Puebla. The specific name alludes to the Tepehua ethnic group and language, these people live in eastern México, in the states of Veracruz and Puebla, in the region where this cichlid is found.

References

tepehua
Endemic fish of Mexico
Freshwater fish of Mexico
Natural history of Puebla
Natural history of Veracruz
Cichlid fish of North America
Fish described in 2015